Mictopsichia is a genus of moths belonging to the family Tortricidae.

Species
Mictopsichia atoyaca  Razowski, 2009
Mictopsichia benevides  Razowski, 2009
Mictopsichia boliviae  Razowski, 2009
Mictopsichia buenavistae  Razowski, 2009
Mictopsichia callicharis Meyrick, 1921
Mictopsichia chlidonata  Razowski, 2009
Mictopsichia chirripoana Razowski, 2011
Mictopsichia cubae  Razowski, 2009
Mictopsichia cubilgruitza Razowski, 2009
Mictopsichia egae  Razowski, 2009
Mictopsichia gemmisparsana (Walker, 1863)
Mictopsichia guatemalae  Razowski, 2009
Mictopsichia hubneriana (Stoll, in Cramer, 1791)
Mictopsichia jamaicana  Razowski, 2009
Mictopsichia janeae Razowski & Pelz, 2010
Mictopsichia marowijneae  Razowski, 2009
Mictopsichia mincae  Razowski, 2009
Mictopsichia miocentra Meyrick, 1920
Mictopsichia misahuallia Razowski, 2011
Mictopsichia ornatissima (Dognin, 1909)
Mictopsichia panamae  Razowski, 2009
Mictopsichia pentargyra Meyrick, 1921
Mictopsichia periopta Meyrick, 1913
Mictopsichia renaudalis (Stoll, in Cramer, 1791)
Mictopsichia rivadeneirai Razowski & Pelz, 2010
Mictopsichia shuara Razowski & Pelz, 2010
Mictopsichia torresi Razowski & Pelz, 2010

Former species
Mictopsichia durranti Walsingham, 1914
Mictopsichia fuesliniana (Stoll, in Cramer, 1781)
Mictopsichia godmani Walsingham, 1914

See also
List of Tortricidae genera

References

 , [1825] 1816, Verz. bekannter Schmett.: 374.
  2009: Revision of Mictopsichia Hübner with descriptions of new species and two new genera (Lepidoptera: Tortricidae). Polish Journal of Entomology 78 (3): 223–252. Full article: 
  2011: Descriptions of five new species of the Neotropical Mictopsichia group of genera (Lepidoptera: Tortricidae). Zootaxa, 3058: 63–68. Preview
 , 2010: Mictopsichia Hübner (Lepidoptera: Tortricidae) from Ecuador. Polish Journal of Entomology 79 (3): 319–326. Full article: .

External links
tortricidae.com

 
Archipini
Tortricidae genera